Mansfield Center Cemetery is a small cemetery in the Mansfield Center section of Mansfield, Connecticut.  Established in 1693, it is one of the few surviving elements of Mansfield's early colonial settlement history.  It also has a distinguished array of funerary markers carved by acknowledged masters across eastern Connecticut.  It was listed on the National Register of Historic Places in 1992.

Description and history
Mansfield Center Cemetery is located south of the modern center of Mansfield, at the southeast corner of Storrs and Cemetery Roads.  It is a roughly rectangular area  in size, ringed by a fieldstone wall.  A line of trees separate the cemetery from Storrs Road, and there is a gate with stone posts providing entrance to the ground.  The cemetery grounds are densely filled with burial sites, with the burials uniformly oriented with the head to the east, and headstones with the carved face to the west.  Only a few more elaborate monuments (typically of mid to late 19th century origin) dot the grounds.  The oldest dated marker is for Exercise Conant, who died in 1722.

Mansfield was settled as part of Windham in 1690, and was separately incorporated in 1704.  The site was set aside for use as a cemetery as early as 1693 and it remained in general use for that purpose until the 1870s. The cemetery's 18th-century gravestones, decorated with cherubim, geometric designs, and a variety of funerary symbols, are considered to be illustrative of the rich artistic tradition of funerary stone carving in colonial New England.  More than 180 stones have been attributed to identifiable stone carvers, including several 18th-century masters of the craft.

See also
Mansfield Center Historic District, also NRHP-listed
National Register of Historic Places listings in Tolland County, Connecticut

References

Protected areas of Tolland County, Connecticut
1693 establishments in Connecticut
Cemeteries on the National Register of Historic Places in Connecticut
Mansfield, Connecticut
National Register of Historic Places in Tolland County, Connecticut